Club Atlético Bembibre is a Spanish football team based in Bembibre, León province, in the autonomous community of Castile and León. Founded in 1922, it plays in Tercera División RFEF – Group 8, holding home games at Estadio La Devesa, with a capacity of 2,750 seats.

History 
Atlético Bembibre was founded in 1922. The club debuted in the Tercera División in 1966.

Season to season

43 seasons in Tercera División
1 season in Tercera División RFEF

Current squad
According to the official website.

Famous players
 Addison Alves
 David Mitogo
   Rui
 Dani Borreguero
 Óscar Contreras

References

External links
Official website 
Futbolme team profile 

Football clubs in Castile and León
Association football clubs established in 1922
1922 establishments in Spain
Province of León